Guilavogui is a surname. Notable people with the surname include:

Josuha Guilavogui (born 1990), French footballer
K. Guilavogui, Guinean politician and engineer
Michel Guilavogui (born 1993), Guinean footballer
Mohamed Guilavogui (born 1996), Malian footballer
Pépé Guilavogui (born 1993), Guinean footballer